J. C. (Judith) Greenburg is the author of the Andrew Lost children's books. Her books blend science and adventure with fun. In April 2018 Greenburg was a featured speaker at the Esther Banker Memorial Series at the Byram Shubert Library in Greeenwich, Connecticut. Her husband, Dan Greenburg, has also published books.

References

External links
 Biography on original Andrew Lost website
 Biography on Random House website
 Biography on Kidsreads website
 Biography on Kids@Random website
  2002–2007

American children's writers
Living people
Year of birth missing (living people)